Twenty Melbourne Painters Society is an Australian arts organisation that was established in 1918. The group split from the Victorian Artists Society to follow the Australian Tonalist Max Meldrum. Membership is restricted to 20 and is upon invitation only. The society follows the traditions of realist, tonal and impressionist painting and holds an annual exhibition.

History
The Twenty Melbourne Painters Society (TMPS) was established in 1918. The group was a break-away group from the Victorian Artists Society, leaving to follow Australian Tonalist Max Meldrum.

In 1919, within the first year of formation, the Twenty Melbourne Painters held their first exhibition.

The group is limited to 20 members and is by invitation.

The Twenty Melbourne Painters has held an annual exhibition since 1919.

Founding TMPS members
 Jas Stuart Anderson
 Alice Marian Ellen Bale
 Elsie Barlow
 Alexander Colquhoun
 George Colville
 Edith Downing
 Bernice E. Edwell
 William ‘Jock’ Frater
 Henrietta Maria Gulliver
 Carl Hampel
 Polly Hurry
 Miss C.E. James
 Richard McCann
 Bertha Merfield
 Albert Ernest Newbury
 Clara Southern
 Ruth Sutherland
 Jo Sweatman
 Isabel May Tweddle
 Rose A. Walker

References

Further reading 
Twenty Melbourne Painters Society Inc. State Library Victoria
Catalogue: 7th annual exhibition (Athenaeum Hall, Melbourne, 1925), State Library Victoria
Catalogue of exhibition (Athenaeum Hall, Melbourne, 1930), State Library Victoria

Art societies
Arts organisations based in Australia
Organisations based in Melbourne
Arts organizations established in 1918
1918 establishments in Australia
Arts in Melbourne